Kalkūne Parish is an administrative unit of Augšdaugava Municipality in the Selonia region of Latvia.

Towns, villages and settlements of Kalkūne Parish

External links 
 

 
Parishes of Latvia
Selonia